The Ukrainian People's Bloc is an electoral bloc in Ukraine. In the 30 September 2007 elections, the bloc failed to win parliamentary representation winning 0,12% of the votes.

Member parties:
Political Party "Cathedral Ukraine"
All-Ukrainian Chornobyl People's Party "For the Welfare and Protection of the People"

References

Political party alliances in Ukraine